Annie Maria Barnes (pen name, Cousin Annie; May 28, 1857 – unknown) was a 19th-century American journalist, editor, and author from South Carolina. At the age of eleven, she wrote an article for the Atlanta Constitution, and at the age of fifteen, she became a regular correspondent of that journal. In 1887, she began publishing The Acanthus, a juvenile paper issued in the South. Barnes published novels from 1887 (Some lowly lives and the heights they reached) until at least 1927 (A knight of Carolina).

Early life and education
Annie Maria Barnes was born in Columbia, South Carolina, May 28, 1857. She was a daughter of James Daniel and Henrietta Jackson Neville Barnes. Her mother, a Neville, traced her descent in a direct line from the Earl of Warwick. Her family was left at the close of the American Civil War, like most Southerners, without means.

Barnes was educated in the public schools of Atlanta, Georgia. She came from a family of editors, and naturally turned to literature. When 11 years of age, she wrote an article for the Atlanta Constitution, which was published and favorably noticed by the editor, and at 15, she became a regular correspondent of that journal.

Career

Before reaching middle age, Barnes had gained recognition in southern juvenile literature. Many of Barnes's earlier works appeared in the Sundayschool Visitor (juvenile periodical; Methodist Episcopal Church, South, Nashville, Tennessee). Barnes served as junior editor for the Woman's Board of Missions, Methodist Episcopal Church, South, having charge of its juvenile paper and of all its quarterly supplies of literature. She was a frequent contributor to leading journals, including Godey's Lady's Book. She served as the editor of Young Christian Worker and the Little Worker (Methodist Episcopal Church periodicals). In 1887, she began publishing a juvenile paper called The Acanthus (juvenile periodical; Atlanta; 1877–84), which was one of two juvenile papers published in the South at the time. While in literary character, it was a success, financially, like so many other southern publications, it was a failure.

Barnes's first book was Some Lowly Lives (Nashville, 1885); and it was followed by The Life of David Livingston (Nashville, Brigham and Smith; 1887), and Scenes in Pioneer Methodism (Nashville, Brigham and Smith; 1889). Later, she wrote The Children of the Kalahari, a child's story of Africa, which was very successful in the U.S. and in England. Two books were published in 1892, The House of Grass and Atlanta Ferryman: A Story of the Chattahoochee. Among her numerous stories which proved to be quite popular, were: Gospel Among the Slaves, The Ferry Maid of the Chattahoochee (Philadelphia, Penn Publishing Company), "ow Achon-hoah Found the Light (Richmond, Presbyterian Committee of Publication), Matouchon, The Outstretched Hand, Carmio, Little Burden-Sharers, Chonite, Marti, The King's Gift, The Red Miriok, The Little Lady of the Fort, Little Betty Blew, Mistress Moppet, A Lass of Dorchester (Boston, Lee and Shepard), Isilda, Tatong, The Laurel Token, and several others. Some of her works were written using the pen name, "Cousin Annie".

Book reviews
Izilda (Presbyterian Committee of Publication, Richmond, Virginia) was reviewed by the Woman's Foreign Missionary Society of the Methodist Episcopal Church, who stated that it is a story for girls, the scene of which is laid in São Paulo, Brazil, the centre of a flourishing Protestant mission. The customs and manners of the residents are placed on a background of the Romish religion. Set brightly against it is the happy Christian life of two Brazilian girls, who, by the simplicity of a life in Christ, win  souls under the leadership of the American missionary. This book was especially adapted to young women's missionary societies.
Woman's Foreign Missionary Society also reviewed Tatono, The Little Slave: A Story of Korea (Presbyterian Publication Committee, Richmond) stating, "The plot is good, the incidents well worked in, and the customs and manners of Korea so thoroughly a part of the story and the missionary element so entirely necessary to it, that the least interested in missions will read every paragraph for the story's sake, while the most interested will seize with eagerness so charming an opportunity to interest the uninterested in the Hermit Nation. The author betrays her southern breeding by occasional provincialisms. Nevertheless, this is the best Korean story we have ever seen."

Personal life
Barnes resided in Summerville, South Carolina.

Selected works

  1887, Some lowly lives and the heights they reached
  1890, Children of the Kalahari : a story of Africa
  1891, Scenes in pioneer Methodism. Carefully edited and illustrated, vol. I.
  1892, The house of grass
  1892, Ninito a story of the Bible in Mexico
  1893, The Gospel among the slaves : a short account of missionary operations among the African slaves of the southern states
  1894, How A-chon-ho-ah found the light
  1895, Matouchon: A Story of Indian Child Life
  1896, Carmio : the little Mexican-Indian captive
  1896, Izilda: a Story of Brazil
  1897, The outstretched hand
  1898, Chonita : a story of the Mexican mines
  1899, Marti : a story of the Cuban war
  1899, The Ferry Maid of the Chattahoochee: A Story for Girls
  1899, Tatong, the little slave : a story of Korea
  1899, Chief-justice Trott and the Carolina pirates
  1900, The first chief justice of Carolina
  1900, The little burden sharers
  1901,  Helps and entertainments for juvenile and young people's missionary societies
  1903, The little lady of the fort
  1903, Little Betty Blew : her strange experiences and adventures in Indian land
  1903, The Red Miriok
  1904, A Lass of Dorchester
  1904, The laurel token: a story of the Yamassee uprising
  1905, An American girl in Korea
  1915, Mistress Moppet
  1925, A little lady at the fall of Quebec
  1925, The lost treasure of Umdilla
  1927, A knight of Carolina

References

Attribution

Bibliography

External links
 
 

1857 births
Year of death unknown
19th-century American women writers
19th-century American newspaper publishers (people)
19th-century American novelists
19th-century American businesswomen
19th-century American businesspeople
20th-century American non-fiction writers
20th-century American women writers
American children's writers
American women novelists
American religious writers
Women religious writers
American women children's writers
Women newspaper editors
People from Columbia, South Carolina
Southern Methodists
American women non-fiction writers
Wikipedia articles incorporating text from A Woman of the Century